WJKR (103.9 FM) is a commercial radio station licensed to Worthington, Ohio, carrying a country format known as "Country 103.9". Owned by the North American Broadcasting Company, Inc., WJKR serves the Columbus metro area. WJKR's studios and transmitter are both located in Columbus. In addition to a standard analog transmission, WJKR broadcasts over two HD Radio subchannels, and is available online.

History
Prior to this station's establishment, the 103.9 MHz frequency in the Columbus market was occupied by WBBY-FM, licensed to Westerville, Ohio. WBBY fell silent on December 31, 1990, after it was found that the majority owner/station manager withheld details to the FCC about his level of involvement in a Marietta, Ohio car dealership. WBBY-FM held a jazz format throughout most of its existence, a format eventually picked up by WZJZ and WSWZ.

Classic rock (1998-2004) 
Signing on in 1998 and also initially licensed to Westerville, this station broadcast classic rock music as WEGE "Eagle 103.9."

Adult hits (2004-2007) 
It became WTDA ("Ted FM") in 2004 with an adult hits format similar to Jack FM, which was taking off across America. (The real Jack FM would later air on this frequency.)  With the Ted FM format, WTDA used the slogan "We Play Anything." The station's call letters attempted to incorporate this "Ted FM" branding. In September 2005, the station's owners added the Indianapolis-based Bob & Tom Show, which had been dropped by Clear Channel's WBWR.

Talk (2007-2009) 
On January 8, 2007, WTDA rebranded itself as the first and only FM talk radio station in Columbus. It picked up The Glenn Beck Program after the show was dropped from WTVN. On September 8, 2007, the Columbus Dispatch reported that WTDA had become the Columbus radio home of the Pittsburgh Steelers football team.

Classic hits (2009-2012) 
On December 21, 2009, WTDA flipped to classic hits and rebranded as "Classic Hits 103.9", using satellite programming from Dial Global's Classic Hits service. WTDA was one of four radio stations in the Columbus market to have a Classic Hits/Oldies format, joining Newark-based WNKO and the WNND/WNNP "Rewind 103.5/104.3" simulcast.

News (2012-2013) 
On June 14, 2012, WTDA flipped to an all-news format, changing the call letters to WMNI-FM, simulcasting with WMNI, which previously had an adult standards format. The simulcast ended on Thursday, July 18, 2013, when WMNI returned to the adult standards format. WMNI-FM kept the news format for a few more days.

Adult hits (2013-2022) 
On July 24, 2013, WMNI-FM changed format to adult hits, subscribing to the JACK FM service. It rebranded as "103-9 Jack FM". The call letters were changed to WJKR the following day. The WJKR call sign was formerly used on 98.9 FM, which itself carried the "Jack FM" format in Columbus, and is now conservative talk WTOH. WJKR changed its city of license from Westerville, Ohio, to Worthington, Ohio, effective August 22, 2013.

Country (2022-present) 
On April 15, 2022, at noon, WJKR flipped to a country music format, branded as "Country 103.9".

WJKR-HD2
On June 14, 2022, WJKR's HD2 subchannel switched from a simulcast of WMNI 920 AM (which flipped to sports) to an adult contemporary format, branded as "Star 95.1" (simulcast on translator W236CZ 95.1 FM Columbus).

Translator
WJKR rebroadcasts its HD2 subchannel on the following translator:

Previous logo

References

External links

JKR
Worthington, Ohio
Radio stations established in 1998
Country radio stations in the United States
1998 establishments in Ohio